Fabricio is a Spanish male given name. Fabrício is the Portuguese equivalent.

Among those with the first name are:
Fabricio Coloccini, Argentine footballer
Fabrício Guerreiro (born 1990), Brazilian mixed martial artist
Fabricio Oberto, Argentine basketball player
Fabrício Ramos da Silva (born 1995), Brazilian footballer
Fabricio Ramos Melo (born 1986), Brazilian footballer
Fabrício (footballer, born February 1990), Fabrício Silva Dornellas, Brazilian football centre-back
Fabrício de Souza
Fabrício dos Santos Silva
Fabrício Werdum (born 1977), Brazilian mixed martial artist
Fabricio Agosto Ramírez, Spanish goalkeeper playing for Fulham F.C.
Fabrício (footballer, born 1995), born Fabrício Ramos da Silva, Brazilian football midfielder
Fabrício (footballer, born 1982), born Fabrício André Pires, Brazilian football midfielder
Fabrício (footballer, born 2000)

See also
Fabrizio (disambiguation)

Spanish masculine given names
Portuguese masculine given names